This is a list of international presidential trips made by Jair Bolsonaro, the 38th President of Brazil. President Bolsonaro has made 24 international trips to 21 countries during his presidency, which began on January 1, 2019 and ended on December 31, 2022. The official residence of the Brazilian president is the Palácio da Alvorada and principal workplace is the Palácio do Planalto, both in Brasília.

The number of visits per country where he traveled are:
 One visit to Bahrain, China, Chile, Ecuador, Guyana, Hungary,  Israel, India, Italy, Paraguay, Russia, Saudi Arabia, Suriname, Switzerland, United Kingdom, Uruguay and the Vatican
 Two visits to Argentina, Japan, Qatar and the United Arab Emirates
 Eight visits to the United States

2019 
The following are the international trips made by President Bolsonaro in 2019.

2020 
The following are the international trips made by President Bolsonaro in 2020.

2021 
The following are the international trips made by President Bolsonaro in 2021.

2022
The following are the international trips made by President Bolsonaro in 2022.

Multilateral meetings 
The following multilateral meetings to take place during President Bolsonaro's 2019–2022 term in office.

See also
2018 Brazilian general election
2022 Brazilian general election
President of Brazil

References 

Jair Bolsonaro
Foreign relations of Brazil
2019 in international relations
2020 in international relations
2021 in international relations
2022 in international relations
Jair Bolsonaro
Brazil diplomacy-related lists
Jair Bolsonaro